The Huckleberry Hound Show is an American animated television series produced by Hanna-Barbera Productions, and the second series produced by the studio following The Ruff and Reddy Show. The show first aired in syndication on September 29, 1958, and was sponsored by Kellogg's. Three segments were included in the program: one featuring Huckleberry Hound, another starring Yogi Bear and his sidekick Boo Boo, and a third with Pixie and Dixie and Mr. Jinks, which starred two mice who in each short found a new way to outwit the cat Mr. Jinks. The series last aired on December 1, 1961.

The Yogi Bear segment of the show became extremely popular, and as a result, it spawned its own series in 1961. A segment featuring Hokey Wolf and Ding-A-Ling was added, replacing Yogi during the 1961–62 season. The show contributed to making Hanna-Barbera a household name, and is often credited with legitimizing the concept of animation produced specifically for television. In 1960, it became the first animated program to be honored with an Emmy Award.

Background/production

Conception and development
Joseph Barbera went to Chicago to pitch the program to Kellogg's executives through their ad agency, Leo Burnett. "I had never sold a show before because I didn't have to. If we got an idea, we just made it, for over twenty years. All of a sudden, I'm a salesman, and I'm in a room with forty-five people staring at me, and I'm pushing Huckleberry Hound and Yogi Bear and 'the Meeces', and they bought it."

Barbera once recalled about Daws Butler's voice acting versatility:

Format
The series featured three seven-minute cartoons, animated specifically for television. The first always starred Huckleberry, the next two featured other characters. Each of three cartoons were in between the wraparound segments, which originally set in the circus tent where Huck acts like a showman in the late 1950s.

Distribution
The show was originally intended to be part of a line-up of kid programmes sponsored by Kellogg and broadcast on ABC-TV, joining Woody Woodpecker, Superman and Wild Bill Hickok in an early evening, weekday line-up. However, Kellogg's agency, Leo Burnett, decided instead to syndicate the show and buy air time on individual stations. The show was originally distributed by Screen Gems, which held a part-ownership of Hanna-Barbera at the time, over 150 stations. In April 1967, Screen Gems announced the show had been released from advertiser control, and would be made available to stations on a syndicated basis with available bridges to create 92 half-hour shows.

The distribution was later passed to Worldvision Enterprises, after it became a sister company to Hanna-Barbera. It was later distributed by Turner Program Services, after Turner's purchase of Hanna-Barbera; current distributor Warner Bros. Television picked up ownership of the show following the 1996 acquisition of Turner by parent company, Time Warner.

Original (1958) Syndication
The show was not broadcast on the same day of the week, or the same time, in every city; airing depended on the deal for time that the Leo Burnett Agency brokered with individual stations. However, the first time the Huck series appeared on television was on Monday, September 29, 1958; it was first seen at 6 p.m. on WOOD-TV in Grand Rapids, Michigan, which also served Battle Creek, home of Kellogg cereals. A few other stations airing it that day were WLWI in Indianapolis (at 6:30 p.m.) and WTAE in Pittsburgh (at 7:30 p.m.). The show debuted on other days that same week in other cities; Huck originally aired in Los Angeles on Tuesdays on KNXT, Chicago on Wednesdays on WGN-TV, and New York City on Thursdays on WPIX. The show first aired in Canada on Thursday, October 2, 1958, at 7 p.m. on CKLW-TV in Windsor, Ontario. The show first aired in Australia on Monday, February 16, 1959, on the National Television Network (now the Nine Network), and the show first aired in the United Kingdom on Friday, July 10, 1959, on ITV.

Plot and characters
Each of the three segments featured one or two main characters acting as a duo, and numerous one-off or supporting characters.

Huckleberry Hound

Huck's voice was one that Butler had already developed and used in earlier work, such as Ruff in The Ruff and Reddy Show, Smedley the Dog in the Chilly Willy cartoons, and earlier characters in the MGM cartoon library. It was said to be based on the neighbor of his wife, Myrtis; Butler would speak with said neighbor when visiting North Carolina.

Yogi Bear

Yogi Bear (voiced by Daws Butler impersonating Ed Norton from The Honeymooners) and his friend Boo Boo Bear (voiced by Don Messick) live in Jellystone Park and occasionally try to steal picnic baskets while evading Ranger Smith (also voiced by Don Messick). Yogi also has a relationship with his girlfriend Cindy Bear (voiced by Julie Bennett).

Pixie & Dixie and Mr. Jinks

Pixie (voiced by Don Messick) and Dixie (voiced by Daws Butler) are two mice who every day end up being chased by a cat named Mr. Jinks (voiced by Daws Butler impersonating Marlon Brando).

Hokey Wolf

Hokey Wolf (voiced by Daws Butler impersonating Phil Silvers) is a con-artist wolf who is always trying to cheat his way to the simple life (much like other Hanna-Barbera characters, Top Cat and Yogi Bear). He is accompanied in this by his diminutive, bowler hat-wearing sidekick Ding-A-Ling Wolf (voiced by Doug Young impersonating Buddy Hackett).

Voice cast
 Daws Butler - Yogi Bear, Huckleberry Hound, Mr. Jinks, Dixie, Hokey Wolf, Narrator, Various
 Don Messick - Narrator, Boo Boo Bear, Pixie, Ranger Smith, Various
 Julie Bennett - Cindy Bear, Various
 Doug Young - Ding-A-Ling Wolf, Various

Additional Voices
 Bea Benaderet - Narrator, Various
 Mel Blanc - Various
 Lucille Bliss - Various
 Red Coffey - Various
 June Foray - Various
 Peter Leeds - Narrator, Various
 GeGe Pearson - Various
 Jean Vander Pyl - Various
 Hal Smith - Various
 Ginny Tyler - Various

Credits
 Producers and Directors: Joseph Barbera and William Hanna
 Voices: Daws Butler, Don Messick
 Story Directors: Alex Lovy, Paul Sommer, Arthur Davis, John Freeman, Lew Marshall
 Story: Warren Foster
 Story Sketch: Dan Gordon, Charles Shows
 Titles: Lawrence Goble
 Musical Director/Composer: Theme Music: Hoyt Curtin
 Designer: Frank Tipper
 Production Supervisor: Howard Hanson
 Animators: Kenneth Muse, Lewis Marshall, Carlo Vinci, Dick Lundy, George Nicholas, Don Patterson, Allen Wilzbach, Ed DeMattia, Manny Perez, Brad Case, Arthur Davis, Ken Southworth, Ken O'Brien, Emil Carle, George Goepper, Don Towsley, Ralph Somerville, C.L. Hartman, John Boersema, Bob Carr, Hicks Lokey, Don Williams, Gerard Baldwin, Ed Parks, Dick Bickenbach, Ed Love, Michael Lah
 Layout: Dick Bickenbach, Walter Clinton, Tony Rivera, Ed Benedict, Michael Lah, Paul Sommer, Dan Noonan, Lance Nolley, Jim Carmichael, Jerry Eisenberg, Jack Huber, Sam Weiss
 Background:  Montealegre, Robert Gentle, Art Lozzi, Richard H. Thomas, Joseph Montell, Vera Hanson, Sam Clayberger, Neenah Maxwell, Frank Tipper

Episodes

Reception
In the film Breakfast at Tiffany's (1961), Holly Golightly (Audrey Hepburn) briefly dons a mask of Huckleberry. The name for Rock et Belles Oreilles, a Québécois comedy group popular during the 1980s, was a pun on the name of Huckleberry Hound ("Roquet Belles Oreilles" in French). Australian prison slang vernacular includes "huckleberry hound", a term originated in the 1960s, meaning "a punishment cell, solitary confinement." In January 2009, IGN named The Huckleberry Hound Show as the 63rd best in its "Top 100 Animated TV Shows".

In 1960s Hungary, the series - there called Foxi Maxi - gained an instant following, also among adults. The reason for this was the fact that legendary scriptwriter József Romhányi had penned dialog with his trademark puns and humor, and some of the most popular actors of the day had supplied the voices. Romhányi and some of the same actors later worked on the Hungarian version of The Flintstones.

Media information

Home media
On , Warner Home Video (via Hanna-Barbera Cartoons and Warner Bros. Family Entertainment) released The Huckleberry Hound Show – Volume 1 for the Hanna-Barbera Classics Collection, featuring the complete first season of 26 episodes (66 segments) from the series on DVD, all presented remastered and restored. However, the episodes in the Volume 1 DVD set were the edited versions, instead of the uncut and unedited, original network broadcast versions due to expensive licensing issues.

Licensing
The characters from The Huckleberry Hound Show spawned various product, publishing, and other licensing deals. Columbia Pictures/Screen Gems' record arm, Colpix, released the first Huckleberry Hound album in October 1958, with stuffed animals and games also hawked in record stores.

No later than 1961, the characters began appearing "in person" at events across America. Hanna Barbera commissioned costumed characters of Huckleberry Hound, Yogi Bear, and Quick Draw McGraw, which appeared at events like the Florida State Fair.

Hanna-Barbera owner Taft Broadcasting started opening theme parks in 1972, beginning with Kings Island. These parks included areas themed to the company's cartoons, and included walk-around characters of Huckleberry Hound, Yogi Bear, and others. The characters were also featured on rides, including carousels. Licensed Huckleberry products included an Aladdin-brand Thermos.

Books based on the show include:
 Huckleberry Hound Christmas, P. Scherr, Golden Press, 25 cents.
 Huckleberry Hound: The Case of the Friendly Monster, Ottenheimer Publishers, 1978, 96 pages.

See also

 List of works produced by Hanna-Barbera Productions
 List of Hanna-Barbera characters
 The Yogi Bear Show
 Pixie and Dixie and Mr. Jinks
 Hokey Wolf

References

External links
 Huckleberry Hound's Toonopedia entry
 The Huckleberry Hound Show at Toon Tracker
 
 The Big Cartoon Database – Informational site and episode guides on The Huckleberry Hound Show.
 The Cartoon Scrapbook – Information and details on Huckleberry Hound.

Huckleberry Hound television series
Yogi Bear television series
1950s American animated television series
1960s American animated television series
1950s American anthology television series
1960s American anthology television series
1950s American comedy television series
1960s American comedy television series
1958 American television series debuts
1961 American television series endings
American children's animated anthology television series
American children's animated comedy television series
Television series by Hanna-Barbera
Television shows adapted into comics
First-run syndicated television programs in the United States
Animated television series about dogs
Television series by Screen Gems
Television series by Sony Pictures Television
Television series by Warner Bros. Television Studios
Circus television shows
Emmy Award-winning programs
English-language television shows